The Kokatha, also known as the Kokatha Mula, are an Aboriginal Australian people of the state of South Australia. They speak the Kokatha language, close to or a dialect of the Western Desert language.

Country
Traditional Kokatha lands extend over some  according to the estimation of Norman Tindale, stretching over some of the harshest, waterless land on the Australian continent. They include Tarcoola, Kingoonyah, Pimba and the McDouall Peak as well as modern townships of Roxby Downs and Woomera. The lands extend west as far as Ooldea and the Ooldea Range while the northern frontier runs up to the Stuart Range and Lake Phillipson. Their boundary with Barngarla lands is marked by an ecological transition from their plateau to the lower hilly acacia scrubland and salt lake zones running south to the coast.

The tribes bordering on Kokatha lands were, running north clockwise, the Pitjantjara, the Yankuntjatjarra, the Antakirinja, the Arabana and Kuyani to their east, the Barngarla on the southeastern flank, the Wirangu directly south, the Mirning southwest, and the Ngalia to their west.

According to the Kokatha Aboriginal Corporation:

History of contact
The Kokatha were engaged in migration towards to southeast before the 1850s, when whites began to make their presence felt. Their hold on Ooldea area was relinquished around 1917 when they yielded before the pressure from the northern Yankuntjatjarra migrating there.

Native title

The Kokatha Aboriginal Corporation is the Registered Native Title Body Corporate (RNTBC) which covers areas determined to belong to the Kokatha people by the Native Title Act 1993, and represents the interests of the Kokatha people., there have been three native title determinations relating to the Kokatha in South Australia:
 An Indigenous land use agreement (ILUA) was determined for the Gawler Ranges area, agreed on 13 June 2010.
 A native title claim lodged by the Far West Coast Aboriginal Corporation RNTBC (representing a number of other peoples as well as the Kokatha nation) was determined on 5 December 2013, and covers land within the Pastoral Unincorporated Area as well as the District Council of Ceduna. This land lies along a wide strip extending inland from the coast, stretching from the border with Western Australia in the west across to a line roughly direct north of the western top edge of the Eyre Peninsula. It excludes a number of areas where native title has been extinguished. There is also an ILUA covering this area, agreed on 22 May 2014.
 The second, determined on 1 September 2014, covers an area within the Roxby Council and some Pastoral Unincorporated Area. It stretches from the eastern shore of Lake Torrens almost to the western shore of Lake Gairdner, but does not include the latter.

An ILUA covers the precise description of the area of land, which is described as "about  extending approx.  west of Lake Torrens".
Large areas within the Woomera Prohibited Area of the RAAF Woomera Range Complex overlap with the native title area.

Significant sites
The dunes and trees of the area within Woomera are considered sacred to the Kokatha people, being linked to their Tjukurpa (Dreaming) stories, in particular that of the Seven Sisters creation story. In particular, the black oak trees are relate to male Kokatha connections to this storyline. The area is supposed to be cleaned by the Department of Defence and the trees protected when weapons testing is under way. However, debris has been found around the site.

There are also a number of significant and rare archaeological sites which are remnants of previous Kokatha habitation within the weapons testing range, which are described in a 2020 heritage management plan prepared for the Department of Defence by GML Heritage Consultants.There are at least 14 separate stone foundations at Lake Hart North (which is not used by the department), which the archaeologists surmised were either "habitation structures" or "low-walled hunting hides".

At another location, Wild Dog Creek, there are a number of rock engravings in the Panaramitee Style (generally dated to the Pleistocene, 10,000 years ago), created by chipping away the rock with sharp tools. Other Aboriginal Australian rock art exists throughout the area, including at Lake Hart, portraying, among other things, footprints which match the Genyornis, a giant bird that went extinct thousands of years ago.

The report states that the location was likely "inhabited and used for many thousands of years", informally dated to up to 50,000 years ago (similar to human habitation in the nearby Flinders Ranges), and the sites could provide hitherto unknown cultural information about the Australian desert area.

Alternative names

 Cocotah, Kookata, Cookutta, Kookatha
 Gawler Range tribe
 Geebera
 Gogada
 Gugada
 Kakarrura. (as karkurera ="east") applied to a band west of Lake Torrens).
 Keibara. ( "plain turkeys"— pejorative)
 Kokatja. (Yankuntjatjarra pronunciation)
 Koogatho, Kugurda,Koogurda, Koocatho
 Koranta
 Kotit-ta
 Kukataja
 Kukatha, Kukata, Kokata
 Madutara. (Antakirinja exonym)
 Maduwonga. (Arabana, also Jangkundjara exonym)
 Nganitjiddia, Nganitjidi, Nganitjini. (Nauo and Barngarla exonym meaning "those who sneak and kill by night.")
 Yallingarra (cf. alindjara ="east").

Source:

Notable people
 Patty Mills, Australian basketballer
 Gavin Wanganeen, Australian rules footballer, and Brownlow medallist
 Norah Wilson (1901-1971), community worker
 Frances Rings, Australian choreographer and dancer

Notes

Citations

Sources

Extract from the National Native Title Register
Extract from the National Native Title Register

Further reading

External links
 Kokatha Aboriginal Corporation

Aboriginal peoples of South Australia